The Innviertel (literally German for "Inn Quarter"; officially called the Innkreis) is a traditional Austrian region southeast of the Inn river. It forms the western part of the state of Upper Austria and borders the German state of Bavaria. The Innviertel is one of the four traditional "quarters" of Upper Austria, the others being Hausruckviertel, Mühlviertel, and Traunviertel.

The Innviertel is the northwestern quarter of Upper Austria and includes the districts Braunau am Inn, Ried im Innkreis and Schärding. Since the formation of the political districts in 1868, the quarters in Upper Austria no longer have a legal basis and are purely regional names. The older Habsburg districts (Kreise), which were still based on the old quarters, were superseded.

Unlike the rest of Upper Austria, most of the area was part of Duchy and, later,  Electorate of Bavaria until the 1779 Treaty of Teschen. It is a fertile, densely populated, flat to hilly landscape that is part of the Alpine foothills and lies between the rivers Salzach, Inn, Danube and the Hausruck hills. The Innviertel covers an area of around 2250 km² and its population is just under 218,000.

The largest city in the Innviertel in terms of area and inhabitants is Braunau am Inn with 17,438 inhabitants, followed by Ried im Innkreis (12,209). The town of Schärding with 5,216 inhabitants is well-known as a tourist centre because of its baroque town centre.

Name 

The term Innviertel for this region is comparatively recent. Before that, the term Innbaiern ("Inn-Bavaria") was common. Innviertel was not used until it was incorporated into Austria in 1779, since at that time the Archduchy above the Enns (today's Upper Austria) was divided into four quarters. According to this administrative structure, the newly acquired area was initially referred to as the "Fifth Quarter" (Fünfte Viertel), but after the amalgamation of Mühlviertel and Machlandviertel it finally became known as the Innviertel.

Geography
The quarter spans the Austrian political districts of Schärding, Ried im Innkreis and Braunau am Inn. Major towns in Innviertel include the district capitals Braunau am Inn, Ried im Innkreis and Schärding as well as Mattighofen and Altheim.

Located within the Alpine foothills, the rural Innviertel is approximately 2250 km² in area and comprises the broad Inn valley, which is largely flat and fertile, and the adjacent undulating landscape in the east, which is rich in granite in the north and coal.

History

Bavaria: Middle Ages and Modern Times 
From the 6th century, most of the Innviertel, with its ducal courts at Ranshofen and Mattighofen, was part of the Mattiggau region of the German stem duchy of Bavaria, the northern part belonging to the Rottachgau. In 1507, Innbaiern became part of the Rentamt of Burghausen with its courts at Wildshut (merged with the Mattighofen District Court), Braunau, Mauerkirchen, Friedburg, Schärding and Ried. The Mondsee area in south Bavaria was lost to the Habsburgs as early as 1506. Administered from the town of Burghausen, the lands beyond the Inn river for centuries had two important roles: strategically as an eastern defence line against the rising Archduchy of Austria, and economically as arable land for crop farming. 

During the Bavarian uprising of 1705–1706 against the occupation by the Habsburg Emperor Joseph I, Braunau was the seat of the short-lived Bavarian State Defence Congress (December 1705), or "Braunau Parliament", which called for a revolt against imperial Habsburg oppression. This was an early occurrence of a parliamentary system in the Holy Roman Empire.

Habsburg era: Treaty of Teschen and Congress of Vienna 
Only after the War of the Bavarian Succession was the area separated from the Electorate of Bavaria. The trigger for the war was the death of the childless Bavarian elector, Maximilian III Joseph (1745–1777). On his death the Bavarian line of the Wittelsbachs died out. A number of Central European powers laid claim to parts of the inheritance, including, first and foremost, Austria with its demands for the cession of Lower Bavaria and the Upper Palatinate. With the ratification of the Treaty of Teschen, which ended the War of the Bavarian Succession, the Innviertel became part of Upper Austria in 1779. 

Thanks to the Treaty of Schönbrunn in 1809, Bavaria took possession of the Innviertel again in 1810. It was assigned to the Bavarian Lower Danube Circle together with parts of the Hausruckviertel. In 1811, the parishes in this area were separated from the Diocese of Linz and assigned to the Bishopric of Passau. Only under the Munich Treaty did the Kingdom of Bavaria finally cede the Innviertel and other areas to the Empire of Austria on 1 May 1816. On 1 July 1816, the Diocese of Linz also took over the corresponding areas again from the Bishopric of Passau.

Language and Bavarian heritage 
At the political level, the incorporation of the new territory into the Land ob der Enns ("Land above the Ems", now Upper Austria) was carried through with a series of measures: oaths of allegiance were sworn by royal Bavarian officials and homage was paid by the Innviertel nobility to the new sovereign. More difficult was administrative integration, which was carried out by a separate "Regional Implementation Commission" (Landes-EinrichtungsKommission) under the direction of Baron Franz Xaver Pockensteiner von Wolffenbach, since the Innviertel had not been an administrative unit until then, but had been administered from Burghausen which was still Bavarian. When the reforms by Emperor Joseph II were intensified by the introduction of new church and school rules in 1795, the population in the parish of St. Georgen gathered signatures at secret gatherings. The higher drinks taxes, which forced breweries to close, also aroused the resentment of the population. So the residents of Innbaiern were not very content with their new situation and the cry "Better to die Bavarian than suffer imperial ruin!" (Lieber bayrisch sterben als kaiserlich verderben!) was in circulation for a long time.

Linguistically, despite the extensive adoption of Austrian standard vocabulary, the dialect characteristics of West Central Bavarian were retained in the Innviertel; which mainly consist of a large number of vocalization features typical of the region (e.g. the word milk, in the Innviertel referred to as Milli or Muich, is mostly known as Müch in the rest of Austria), has survived to this day (compare Bavarian language). In the west the language changes gradually over into the West Central Bavarian dialects.

In the architecture of the towns, the colourfully decorated house facades of the Inn-Salzach Style are reminiscent of the Bavarian tradition.

Regional exhibitions 
The first Bavarian-Upper Austrian regional exhibition took place in 2004 in Passau, Asbach, Reichersberg and Schärding.

Relations with the rest of Upper Austria 
The Innviertel was the centre of the violent Bavarian uprising against Austrian occupation in 1705 and 1706. However, after its transfer to Austria in 1779, no broader resistance formed. For example, Franz Stelzhamer promoted mutual nationality in his prosaic work “Dá Soldatnvödá”  and was considered an Upper Austrian "national poet" from the 19th century even though he came from the Innviertel.

Nonetheless, up to the 20th century there were disputes between groups from Innviertel and so-called "Landlers" ("Landl" is a term for the Hausruckviertel or for Upper Austria in general) at the level of the young farmers' clubs (Innviertler Zeche). From this time stem locally well-known sayings and declarations of war such as Wenn d’ Innviertler keman, hoasts umirucka! ("when the Innviertel folk come, it's time to go home!"). A certain local rivalry has emerged in the last few years, even in institutional circles, for example in the tourist sector, from the Grieskirchen district to the Innviertel and, further east, to the state capital of Linz, and is primarily expressed in sporting competitions and political and public debates about the disadvantages of the Innviertel compared to the more central regions of Upper Austria, which at times dominate reporting in the local media.

One of these political points of contention for years has been the inadequately developed road link to the nearby city of Salzburg, to which the upper Innviertel (Braunau district and the southwestern parts of Ried district) is oriented. Nevertheless, the Vienna-Linz-Munich link is an important transport route. As the urban centre of the lower Innviertel (Schärding District, northeastern parts of Ried district), Passau plays a major role. A perceived independence of the Innviertel is also reflected in the "capital city debate", which was kicked off by the Mayor of Ried, Albert Ortig, during the 2009 election campaign and in which he declared the town of Ried to be the capital of the Innviertel and thus provoked the politicians of Braunau.

Despite all these circumstances , the inhabitants of the Innviertel identify far more with their region today than those in the remaining quarters of Upper Austria which, with the exception of the Mühlviertel, which is bordered by the Danube, deviate to some extent geographically from modern district boundaries.

Demographics
Today the Innviertel has about 215,000 people in its towns, villages and hamlets. Its Bavarian roots show in the local German dialect, Innviertlerisch, a Western Central Austro-Bavarian variant similar to the languages spoken in adjacent Lower Bavaria.

Notable people
Innviertel is the birthplace of Franz Xaver Gruber, composer of Silent Night, opera singer Franz Xaver Gerl, the Schwanthaler family of Baroque sculptors, SS general and war criminal Ernst Kaltenbrunner,  beatified conscientious objector Franz Jägerstätter, and physicist Anton Zeilinger. Both Adolf Hitler and the diplomat Egon Ranshofen-Wertheimer were born in the town of Braunau am Inn on the German border.

Gallery

See also
Upper Austria
Hausruckviertel
Mühlviertel
Traunviertel

References

Literature 
 
 Herbert Wurster: Heimat am Inn, Kultur und Geschichte, Simbach/Braunau/Inn 1999 (siehe auch www.hrb.at).

External links 

 Innviertel.at
 Innviertel Tourism sebsite
 Overview map of the Innviertel boundaries (pdf file; 341 kB) at DORIS
 Division of NUTS-III regions in Upper Austria
 Photos from the Innviertel at Flickr
 Culture, Traditions and Customs of the Inhabitants of the Innkreis, 1832

Geography of Upper Austria